Zaki al-Ghul (Arabic: زكي الغول; born 1926 – 28 April 2019) was a Palestinian politician based in Jordan. Born in 1926 in Silwan neighbourhood, Jerusalem, he graduated from the Palestinian Institute of Law in 1948 and held a doctorate from John F. Kennedy University in 2006. Since 1999 he served as the titular mayor of East Jerusalem. Due to the forced shutting down of all councils related to the East Jerusalem municipal services by Israeli authorities, al-Ghul held what constitutes a purely formal position or title without any practical or real authority.

References

1926 births
2019 deaths
John F. Kennedy University alumni
Mayors of Jerusalem
Palestinian politicians
Politicians from Jerusalem
Jordanian people of Palestinian descent
Palestinian expatriates in Jordan
Burials at Sahab Cemetery